Segunda División Amateur was the third division of the Asociación Uruguaya de Fútbol league system. The league was sometimes referred to as Segunda Amateur.

List of champions

Tournament names:
 1972–1996: Primera C
 1997–2008: Liga Metropolitana Amateur
 2009–2016: Segunda División B Amateur

Titles by club

External links
 Segunda División Amateur Official Website (Spanish)

3
Sports leagues established in 1972
1972 establishments in Uruguay
Uru